Clover Creek is a  tributary of the Frankstown Branch Juniata River in Bedford and Blair counties, Pennsylvania, in the United States.

It originates in Woodbury Township in Bedford County on Tussey Mountain, between Pulpit Hill and the north end of Warrior Ridge. It flows northward through Morrisons Cove along the west side of Tussey Mountain, passing through Henrietta, and receives Middle Run to the north of there. Pennsylvania Route 164 crosses it at the village of Clover Creek. The creek follows the mountain in curving slightly eastward as well as northward, and passes through Beavertown and Shellytown. Around Larke, the valley begins to deepen, and just after meeting Snare Run, the creek joins the Frankstown Branch Juniata River at Cove Forge.

Although the stream is small, it is well known for its trout fishing, and is fished heavily during open seasons. Clover Creek also serves as a valuable irrigation source for nearby farmers.

Tributaries
Snare Run
Middle Run

See also
List of rivers of Pennsylvania

References

Rivers of Pennsylvania
Tributaries of the Juniata River
Rivers of Bedford County, Pennsylvania
Rivers of Blair County, Pennsylvania